The 2009 USL Premier Development League season was the 15th season of the PDL. The regular season began on May 1, 2009, and ended on July 19, 2009. The PDL Championship Game was held on August 8, 2009, and was broadcast on Fox Soccer Channel in the United States.

Ventura County Fusion finished the season as national champions, beating Chicago Fire Premier 2-1 in the PDL Championship game in Ventura, California on August 8, 2009.

Reading Rage finished with the best regular season record in the league, winning 13 out of their 16 games, suffering just one loss, and finishing with a +41 goal difference.

Reading Rage striker Aaron Wheeler was the league's top scorer and MVP, knocking in 17 goals, while his teammate Jon Ports led the league with 10 assists. Mississippi Brilla goalkeeper Josh Pantazelos enjoyed the best goalkeeping statistics, with a goals against average of 0.615 on the season, including 8 shutouts.

Changes From 2008

Name Changes 
Cary Railhawks U23's changed their name to the Cary Clarets to reflect their new association with English Championship team Burnley.
New Orleans Shell Shockers rebranded themselves as the New Orleans Jesters, having terminated their sponsorship deal with the Shell Oil Company.

New Franchises 
Eleven franchises have been announced as joining the league this year:

On hiatus 
One team went on hiatus due to home stadium renovations:
Vermont Voltage - St. Albans, Vermont

Folding 
Nine teams have been announced as leaving the league prior to the beginning of the season:
Atlanta Silverbacks U23's - Chamblee, Georgia
Cape Cod Crusaders - Buzzards Bay, Massachusetts
Colorado Rapids U23's - Boulder, Colorado
Palm Beach Pumas - Wellington, Florida
Richmond Kickers Future - Richmond, Virginia
San Fernando Valley Quakes - Woodland Hills, California
San Francisco Seals - San Francisco, California
San Jose Frogs - San Jose, California
West Michigan Edge - Kentwood, Michigan

Standings
In 2009, there was a more balanced 8 divisions (down from 10 in 2008).  The top 3 from each division qualified for the play-offs, with the division champion receiving a bye through the first round.

Central Conference

Great Lakes Division

Heartland Division

Eastern Conference

Mid Atlantic Division

Northeast Division

Southern Conference

Mid South Division

Note: Austin finish in third place as a result of winning the head-to-head season series 2-0-1 against El Paso.

Southeast Division

Western Conference

Northwest Division

Southwest Division

Playoffs

Format
The top three teams from each division earn playoff bids. The division champion earns a bye to the Division Finals and the rights to host. The second place team will host the third place team in the Division Semifinals either at their home field or at the division champion's field. The two notable exceptions were the Chicago Fire Premier hosting Forest City London in Fort Wayne, Indiana, and Ventura County Fusion hosting the Los Angeles Legends, despite Los Angeles having the higher seed.

Bracket

Divisional Semifinals

Divisional Finals

Conference Finals

PDL Semifinals

PDL Championship

Award Winners and Finalists
The awards finalists, Goalkeeper of the Year, and All-League teams were announced on August 4, 2009, with the winners announced on August 6.

Most Valuable Player
 Aaron Wheeler, F, Reading Rage (Winner)
 Tom Oatley, F, Kalamazoo Outrage
 Debola Ogunseye, F, Mississippi Brilla

U19 Player of the Year
 Christian Ibeagha, D, Cary Clarets (Winner)
 Sheanon Williams, D, Carolina Dynamo
 Max Touloute, F, Fort Wayne Fever

Defender of the Year
 Christian Ibeagha, Cary Clarets (Winner)
 Bonivenger Misiko, Fort Wayne Fever
 Daniel Scott, Seattle Wolves
 Chris Williams, New Orleans Jesters

Goalkeeper of the Year
 Jimmy Maurer, Chicago Fire Premier

Coach of the Year
 Casey Mann, Des Moines Menace (Winner)
 Dan Fisher, Long Island Rough Riders
 Mark Spooner, Kalamazoo Outrage
 Brent Whitfield, Los Angeles Legends

All-League and All-Conference Teams

Central Conference
F: Andre Akpan, CHI; Teal Bunbury, ROC; Tom Oatley*, KAL
M: Dave Hertel*, MIC; Nolan Intermoia, TB; Brad Stisser, COL
D: Anthony Di Biase, LON; Bonivenger Misiko*, FW; Wilson Neto, TB; Brian Wurst, KC
G: Jimmy Maurer*, CHI
Honorable Mention: Justin Ferguson, D, SPR; Saidi Isaac, F, IND; David Mueller, D, SL; Armin Mujdzic, F, DM; Yoram Mwila, M, CLE;  Kyle Segebart, D, CIN; Jordan Webb, M, TOR

Eastern Conference
F: Cody Arnoux, CAR; Adam Arthur, WV; Aaron Wheeler*, REA
M: Will Beague*, OTT; Adam Gazda, REA; Zach Loyd, CAR
D: Brien Chamney, OTT; Christian Ibeagha*, CRY; Rich Martinez, LI; Sheanon Williams, CAR
G: Tunde Ogunbiyi, OCC
Honorable Mention: Frank Alesci, M, BRK; Zachary Carr, G, NJ; Kevon Harris, M, HR; Sean Kelley, G, NV; Michael Konicoff, M, WCH; Jerrod Laventure, F, NWK; Ken Manaham, G, FRB; Matthew Marcin, M, RI; Timothy Murray, G, NH; Ian Stowe, M, VIR

Southern Conference
F: Zak Boggs, BRD; Salvador Luna, RGV; Debola Ogunseye*, MIS
M: Danny Galvan, LAR;Greg Mulamba, LAR; Gary Stopforth, NO
D: Jamie Cunningham, AUS; Dwyane Demmin, MIS; Thomas Wharf, PAN; Chris Williams*, NO
G: Ryan Cooper, LAR
Honorable Mention: Jay Ambrosy, M, HOU; Lief Craddock, G, WTU; Janrai Gravely, G, DFW; Tommy Krizanovic, F, CF; Wilfrid Loizeau, M, ATL; Felipe Lowall, M, BR; Ryan McDonald, D, NAS; Jorge Muniz, G, EP

Western Conference
F: Rory Agu, TAC; Brent Whitfield, LA; Ryan Youngblood, POR
M: Ely Allen, SEA; Tomislav Colic, SC; Michael Farfan, LA; Armando Ochoa*, HU
D: Nick Cardenas, OGD; Mark Lee, KIT; Dan Scott*, SEA
G: Dustyn Brim, KIT
Honorable Mention: Richie Bindrup, M, BYU; Zach Brunner, G, LAN; Jason Devinish, M, VIC; Gagandeep Dosanjh, M, VAN; Eddie Gutierrez, M, FRE; Anthony Hamilton, F, VEN; Jacob Hustedt, M, BAK; Kristjan Johannson, G, ABB; Kristopher Minton, G, ORC; Vinicius Oliveira, F, YAK; John Prugh, F, SPO; Steve Reese, G, CSC

* denotes All-League selection

See also
United Soccer Leagues 2009
2009 W-League Season

References

2009
4
3
3